Stormcock may refer to:
 Stormcock, another name for the Mistle thrush (Turdus viscivorus)
 Stormcock (album), a 1971 album by Roy Harper